Kinku is a genus of spiders in the Telemidae family. It was first described in 2015 by Dupérré & Tapia. , it contains only one species, Kinku turumanya, found in Ecuador.

References

Telemidae
Monotypic Araneomorphae genera
Spiders of South America